2006 heat wave may refer to:
2006 European heat wave (July)
2006 North American heat wave (July and August)